Ina is a feminine given name which may refer to:

 Saint Ina, fifth-century Welsh saint
 Ine of Wessex, also spelled Ina, king of Wessex from 688 to 726
Ina Albowitz (born 1943), German politician
Ina Ananieva (born 1977), former Bulgarian gymnast and rhythmic gymnastics coach
 Ina Balin (1937–1990), American actress born Ina Rosenberg
 Ina Bandy (1903-1973), humanist photographer
 Ina Bauer (figure skater) (1941–2014), German figure skater
 Ina Benita (1912–1984), Polish actress
 Ina Claire (1893–1985), American actress born Ina Fagan
Ina Coolbrith (1841–1928), American poet, writer and librarian
 Ina Drew (born c. 1956), former Wall Street executive
 Ina Fried (born Ian Fried in 1974), American journalist and former child actor
 Ina Garten (born 1948), American author
Ina Jang (born 1982), South Korean photographer
Ina Justh (born 1969), German rower
 Ina Lange (1846—1930), Finnish pianist, writer and music historian
Ina Latendorf (born 1971), German politician
 Ina Müller (born 1965), German singer-songwriter, comedian, television host and author
Ina Nikulina (born 1995), Belarusian rower
Ina Norris, American playwright
 Ina Rama (born 1972), Prosecutor General of the Republic of Albania from 2007 to 2012
 Ina Raymundo (born 1975), Filipina actress, model and singer
 Ina Weisse (born 1968) German actress, screenwriter and film director
 Ina Wroldsen (born 1984), Norwegian singer and songwriter

Feminine given names